Richard Goldwin Yu Monteverde (sometimes spelled as Goldwyn) is a Filipino basketball coach currently serving as the head coach for the UP Fighting Maroons.

He formerly coached the NU Bullpups (National University's junior basketball team) and Adamson Baby Falcons (Adamson University's junior basketball team).

Playing career

UP 1986 championship 
Monteverde was one of the players who won the UAAP basketball championship in 1986, together with PBA legends Benjie Paras and Ronnie Magsanoc, PBA player turned head coach Eric Altamirano, and future PBA assistant coach Joey Guanio under the tutelage of Joe Lipa, a UP alumnus.

Coaching career

High school ranks 
Monteverde first coached in the high school level at Saint Stephen's High School in 1991. During this time, his assistant was Bonnie Tan, future NCAA winning coach of Letran Knights. Monteverde coached the "A" team of the school starting in 1993, and led them to five Metro Manila Tiong Lian Basketball League (MMTLBL) titles in the next decade. He then coached Chiang Kai-shek College in the MMTLBL and also led them into championships.

Monteverde coached the Adamson Baby Falcons and created a winning culture, as the team qualified in every Juniors' Basketball Final Four appearances from 2014 to 2017.

Monteverde then replaced Jeff Napa as NSNU Bullpups head coach. He led the Bulldogs to three Finals appearances and two UAAP Juniors basketball championships from 2017 to 2020. He was elevated to the seniors' NU Bulldogs team in May 2020. However, several players from the Bulldogs parted ways with the team. all with the blessing of Monteverde. Weeks later, Monteverde resigned as Bulldogs coach without coaching a game.

UP Fighting Maroons 
Monteverde was hired by the UP Fighting Maroons in 2021, replacing Bo Perasol who had been promoted to the front office of the team. Together with Carl Tamayo, his former player at NU Bullpups, they led the team to their first championship since 1986, back when Monteverde himself played. He led UP back to the Finals for Season 85, but they lost to the Ateneo Blue Eagles.

Coaching record

Collegiate record

Personal life 
Monteverde is the son of Regal Films founder Lily Monteverde.

References 

UP Fighting Maroons basketball players
Filipino men's basketball coaches
1971 births
Living people
Filipino people of Chinese descent
UP Fighting Maroons basketball coaches